Apamea maxima is a moth of the  family Noctuidae. It is native to western North America, where it is found from British Columbia to California.

External links
Images
Bug Guide

Apamea (moth)
Moths of North America
Moths described in 1904
Taxa named by Harrison Gray Dyar Jr.